The 2009–10 Yemeni League is the 18th edition of top-level football in Yemen.

Al-Hilal Al-Sahili are defending champions for the past two seasons.

The season started in November and will last until June 2010. The league winners will qualify for the AFC Cup. The bottom four teams will be relegated

Stadia and locations

Final standings

Yemeni League seasons
Yem
1